HMS Birkenhead, also referred to as HM Troopship Birkenhead or Steam Frigate Birkenhead, was one of the first iron-hulled ships built for the Royal Navy. She was designed as a steam frigate, but was converted to a troopship before being commissioned.

While transporting troops and a few civilians to Algoa Bay, the Birkenhead was wrecked on 26 February 1852 at Danger Point near Gansbaai,  from Cape Town in the Cape Colony. There were insufficient serviceable lifeboats for all the passengers, and the soldiers famously stood in ranks on board, thereby allowing the women and children to board the boats safely and escape the sinking.

Only 193 of the estimated 643 people on board survived, and the soldiers' chivalry gave rise to the unofficial "women and children first" protocol when abandoning ship, while the "Birkenhead drill" of Rudyard Kipling's poem came to describe courage in the face of hopeless circumstances.

Description and history
The Birkenhead was laid down at John Laird's shipyard at Birkenhead as the frigate HMS Vulcan, but renamed Birkenhead soon afterwards after the town where she was built. She had two  steam engines from Forrester & Co that drove a pair of  paddle wheels, and two masts rigged as a brig.

According to her designer, John Laird: 

The ship was divided into eight watertight compartments, while the engine room was divided by two longitudinal bulkheads into four compartments, making 12 watertight compartments in total. She had a round stern and a bow that ended in a large figurehead of Vulcan, holding a hammer in one hand, and some of "the bolts of Jove" that he had just forged in the other. Her armament was originally intended to be two 96-pounder pivot guns, one forward and the other aft, and four 68-pounder broadside guns.

Launch and early life 
The Birkenhead was launched on 30 December 1845 by the Marchioness of Westminster. Her hull then weighed 903 tons and drew , although she was at this time missing approximately 15 tons of cabin fittings. Machinery, stores, and other fittings were expected to add an additional 1,000 or so tons, increasing her draught six more feet.

She remained laid up for some time, before being put to varied use around England, Scotland and Ireland. In November 1846, Isambard Kingdom Brunel's iron ship SS Great Britain ran aground on the sands of Dundrum Bay, Ireland. There was doubt as to whether she could be re-floated. Brunel advised that if anyone could rescue the ship then the man to do it was the naval engineer, James Bremner. He was engaged and the Great Britain was re-floated on 27 August 1847 with the assistance of HMS Birkenhead.

The Birkenhead was never commissioned as a frigate, as two factors came into play while she was still under construction that resulted in her being converted into a troopship. Firstly, the Royal Navy's warships were switched from paddle wheels to more efficient propeller propulsion, following an experiment by the Admiralty in 1845 in which the benefits of the propeller over the paddle wheel were dramatically demonstrated. Secondly, the Admiralty had doubts about the effects of cannon shot against iron hulls – in a number of trials carried out at the Royal Arsenal in 1845, at lower velocities shot made a jagged hole that was hard to plug.

On 15 September 1847, Birkenhead ran down and sank the brig Oratio in the English Channel off The Lizard, Cornwall. The owners of the brig sued for their loss in the Admiralty Court. Birkenhead was found to be to blame as she had no look-out posted, being nineteen short in her crew.

As part of her conversion to a troopship in 1851, a forecastle and poop deck were added to the Birkenhead to increase her accommodation, and a third mast was added, to change her sail plan to a barquentine. Although she never served as a warship, she was faster and more comfortable than any of the wooden sail-driven troopships of the time, making the trip from the Cape in 37 days in October 1850.

Final voyage (1852)

In January 1852, under the command of Captain Robert Salmond RN, the Birkenhead left Portsmouth conveying troops from ten different regiments, including the 2nd Regiment of Foot and the 74th Regiment of Foot, to the Eighth Xhosa War against the Xhosa in the Cape Colony. On 5 January, she picked up more soldiers at Queenstown (now Cobh), Ireland, and conveyed some officers' wives and families.
On 23 February 1852, Birkenhead docked briefly at Simon's Town, near Cape Town. Most of the women and children disembarked along with a number of sick soldiers. Nine cavalry horses, several bales of hay and 35 tons of coal were loaded for the last leg of the voyage to Algoa Bay.

She sailed from Simon's Bay at 18:00 on 25 February 1852 with between 630 and 643 men, women and children aboard, the exact number being in some doubt. In order to make the best possible speed, Captain Salmond decided to hug the South African coast, setting a course that was generally within  of the shore. The sea was calm and the night was clear as she left False Bay and headed east.

The rock lies near Danger Point (near Gansbaai, Western Cape). Barely submerged, this rock is clearly visible in rough seas, but it is not immediately apparent in calmer conditions.

Captain Salmond rushed on deck and ordered the anchor to be dropped, the quarter-boats to be lowered, and a turn astern to be given by the engines. However, as the ship backed off the rock, the sea rushed into the large hole made by the collision and the ship struck again, buckling the plates of the forward bilge and ripping open the bulkheads. Shortly, the forward compartments and the engine rooms were flooded, and over 100 soldiers were drowned in their berths.

Sinking 
The surviving soldiers mustered and awaited their officers' orders. Salmond ordered the senior military officer, Colonel Seton, to send men to the chain pumps. Sixty were directed to this task, sixty more were assigned to the tackles of the lifeboats, and the rest were assembled on the poop deck in order to raise the forward part of the ship. The women and children were placed in the ship's cutter which lay alongside. Two other large boats (capacity 150 each) were manned, but one was immediately swamped and the other could not be launched due to poor maintenance and paint on the winches. This left only three smaller boats available.

The surviving officers and men assembled on deck, where Lieutenant-Colonel Seton of the 74th Foot took charge of all military personnel and stressed the necessity of maintaining order and discipline to his officers. As a survivor later recounted: "Almost everybody kept silent, indeed nothing was heard, but the kicking of the horses and the orders of Salmond, all given in a clear firm voice."

Ten minutes after the first impact, the engines still turning astern, the ship struck again beneath the engine room, tearing open her bottom. She instantly broke in two just aft of the mainmast. The funnel went over the side and the forepart of the ship sank at once. The stern section, now crowded with men, floated for a few minutes before sinking.

Just before she sank, Salmond called out that "all those who can swim jump overboard, and make for the boats". Colonel Seton, however, recognising that rushing the lifeboats would risk swamping them and endangering the women and children, ordered the men to stand fast, and only three men made the attempt. The cavalry horses were freed and driven into the sea in the hope that they might be able to swim ashore.

The soldiers did not move, even as the ship broke up barely 20 minutes after striking the rock.

The next morning, the schooner Lioness discovered one of the cutters and, after saving the occupants of the second boat, made her way to the scene of the disaster. Arriving in the afternoon, she found 40 people still clinging to the rigging. It was reported that, of the approximately 643 people aboard, only 193 were saved. Captain Edward WC Wright of the 91st Argyllshire Regiment was the most senior army officer to survive; he was made a brevet major for his actions during the ordeal, dated 26 February 1852.

The number of personnel aboard is in some doubt, but an estimate of 638 was published in The Times. It is generally thought that the survivors comprised 113 soldiers (all ranks), 6 Royal Marines, 54 seamen (all ranks), 7 women, 13 children and at least one male civilian, but these numbers cannot be substantiated, as muster rolls and books were lost with the ship.

Of the horses, eight made it safely to land, while the ninth had its leg broken while being pushed into the sea.

Aftermath

A number of sailors were court martialled as a result of the accident. The court was held on 8 May 1852 on board HMS Victory in Portsmouth, and attracted a great deal of interest. However, as none of the senior naval officers of the Birkenhead survived, no-one was found to be to blameworthy. Captain Edward W. C. Wright of the 91st Argyllshire Regiment told the court martial:

The order and regularity that prevailed on board, from the moment the ship struck till she totally disappeared, far exceeded anything that I had thought could be effected by the best discipline; and it is the more to be wondered at seeing that most of the soldiers were but a short time in the service. Everyone did as he was directed and there was not a murmur or cry amongst them until the ship made her final plunge – all received their orders and carried them out as if they were embarking instead of going to the bottom – I never saw any embarkation conducted with so little noise or confusion.

In 1895, a lighthouse was erected at Danger Point to warn shipping of the dangerous reef. In 1936, a remembrance plate for the Birkenhead was affixed to its base by the Navy League of South Africa. A new Birkenhead memorial was erected nearby in March 1995. In December 2001, the plaque was moved closer to the lighthouse.

A memorial in St Giles' Cathedral, Edinburgh, bears the following inscription:

Frederick William IV of Prussia was so impressed by the bravery and discipline of the soldiers that he ordered an account of the incident to be read at the head of every regiment in his army. Queen Victoria ordered the erection of an official Birkenhead monument at the Chelsea Royal Hospital. In 1892, Thomas M. M. Hemy painted a widely admired maritime depiction of the incident, "The wreck of the Birkenhead". Prints of this painting were distributed to the public. In 1977, the South African mint issued a "Heroes of the Birkenhead Medallion" gold coin commemorating the 125 years since the sinking, featuring Hemy's painting on one of the faces of the coin.

Legacy

Birkenhead drill
The sinking of the Birkenhead is one of the earliest maritime disaster evacuations during which the concept of "women and children first" is known to have been applied. "Women and children first" subsequently became standard procedure in relation to the evacuation of sinking ships, in fiction and in life. The term "Birkenhead drill" became defined as courageous behaviour in hopeless circumstances and appeared in Rudyard Kipling's 1893 tribute to the Royal Marines, "Soldier an' Sailor Too":

To take your chance in the thick of a rush, with firing all about,
Is nothing so bad when you've cover to 'and, an' leave an' likin' to shout;
But to stand an' be still to the Birken'ead drill is a damn tough bullet to chew,
An' they done it, the Jollies – 'Er Majesty's Jollies – soldier an' sailor too!
Their work was done when it 'adn't begun; they was younger nor me an' you;
Their choice it was plain between drownin' in 'eaps an' bein' mopped by the screw,
So they stood an' was still to the Birken'ead drill, soldier an' sailor too

Birkenhead treasure

There was a rumour that the Birkenhead was carrying a military payroll of £240,000 in gold coins weighing about three tons, which had been secretly stored in the powder-room before the final voyage. Numerous attempts have been made to salvage the gold. In 1893, the nephew of Colonel Seton wrote that a certain Mr. Bandmann at the Cape obtained permission from the Cape Government to dive the wreck of the Birkenhead in search of the treasure. A June 1958 salvage attempt by a renowned Cape Town diver recovered anchors and some brass fittings but no gold. In 1986–1988, a combined archaeological and salvage excavation was carried out by Aqua Exploration, Depth Recovery Unit and Pentow Marine Salvage Company. Only a few gold coins were recovered, which appear to have been the possessions of the passengers and crew.

The rumour of treasure and the shallow depth of the wreck at  have resulted in the wreck being considerably disturbed, despite its being a war grave. In 1989, the British and South African governments entered into an agreement over the salvage of the wreck, sharing any gold recovered.

HMS Birkenhead as namesake
Three placenames in the Canadian province of British Columbia were conferred in honour of the Birkenhead disaster by Hudson's Bay Company explorer Alexander Caulfield Anderson, a boyhood friend and cousin of Lt-Col. Seton of the 74th Regiment of Foot, on a traverse of uncharted country between the Fraser Canyon and the coastal Lower Mainland in 1846. Named after his cousin, Seton Lake cuts west through the Coast Mountains from the Fraser Canyon town of Lillooet, beyond which is its twin Anderson Lake.

A few miles southwest from the head of Anderson Lake is Mount Birkenhead, named by Anderson, on the north side of the low pass connecting the valley of those lakes to that of the Birkenhead River. The river, the valley area near Mount Birkenhead known as Birken, and Birkenhead Lake at the summit of the pass were in turn named after the mountain, and not directly by Anderson.

Other name legacies
According to local tradition, Salmonsdam Nature Reserve in the Overberg—a region in South Africa—is named after Captain Robert Salmond. Locals to this day refer to Great White Sharks as "Tommy Sharks," after the Tommys that were taken by them in water.

See also
 Arniston, a wreck in 1815 on the same coast that also involved the 73rd Regiment of Foot
 , a troopship which hit a mine in the same area in 1917; the orderly evacuation of troops was compared to Birkenhead, although there were no casualties and the ship was saved from sinking by skilled seamanship and damage control.

Notes

References

Bibliography
 
 
 Bevan, David (1995). Daughters of the Regiment. London: Traditional Publishing.
 Bevan, David (1998). Stand Fast. London: Traditional Publishing. (2nd Ed. Originally entitled: Drums of the Birkenhead, Larsen: 1972). 
 Carver, Stephen (2016). Shark Alley: The Memoirs of a Penny-a-Liner. Green Door Press. 
 Doyle, Francis Hastings. "The Loss of the Birkenhead". Poems of South African History, A.D. 1497–1910.
 
 Lyon, David; Winfield, Rif (2004). The Sail and Steam Navy List: All the Ships of the Royal Navy 1815–1889. Chatham Publishing. .

External links

 Survivors of the wreck of HM Troopship Birkenhead 50 years later
 Shipwrecks and excavations-HM Troopship Birkenhead
 Scuba Diving: Birkenhead: South Africa: Submerged Productions
 A tribute to the soldiers aboard HM Transport Birkenhead
 Thomas M. M. Hemy (1852–1937) – The Wreck of the 'Birkenhead'
 The legend of the HMS Birkenhead
 Story of the Birkenhead

 

Troop ships of the Royal Navy
Troop ships of the United Kingdom
Shipwrecks of the South African Atlantic coast
Ships built on the River Mersey
Maritime incidents in September 1847
Maritime incidents in February 1852
1852 in South Africa
Steam frigates
1845 ships
Maritime incidents in South Africa
King's Royal Rifle Corps
19th-century history of the British Army
Shark attacks